Second Chance: Three Presidents and the Crisis of American Superpower is a 2007 book by Zbigniew Brzezinski, who was President Carter's National Security advisor and a scholar of American foreign policy as a professor at
the School of Advanced International Studies at Johns Hopkins University. The book discusses the 15 years of American foreign policy where the U.S., emerging as the "victor" in the Cold War, has been the lone "superpower." Brzezinski writes about how United States presidents George H. W. Bush, Bill Clinton, and George W. Bush have demonstrated leadership and wielded power throughout a decade and a half as the leaders of a virtually unchallenged world power.

Synopsis
Brzezinski sets the book up by giving his history of the Cold War, and
how it was a combination of presidents, not just Ronald Reagan, and
international events that lead to the demise of the Soviet system.  He
describes the two emerging views of the world as the "Globalization" view
and the "Neoconservative" view.  In each of the next three chapters, he
describes the president, his foreign policy team, and the events and
people which shaped that president's foreign policy.  He focuses on three
main factors, the "Atlantic Alliance," nuclear non-proliferation, and the
Israeli/Palestinian conflict, but discusses other foreign policy issues
(e.g. the environment, emerging South American nationalism, and the rise
of China and India).

In the middle three chapters, "The Original Sin" (Bush I), "The Impotence of Good
Intentions" (Clinton), and "Catastrophic Leadership" (Bush II), he compares
the presidents and the decisions made or not made by their foreign policy
teams.  He is equally critical of Bush I and Clinton and rates them nearly
the same, but with different strengths and weaknesses.  He is harshest on
the Bush II administration, particularly with regard to its treatment of
the Atlantic Alliance, the Middle East, and the environment.

In the chapter titled "After 2008," Dr. Brzezinski suggests the next president must strengthen
the Atlantic Alliance; reform lobbying; demonstrate leadership in the Middle
East, particularly with regard to Israel/Palestine; foster consensus on
the environment; and formulate a better strategy with regard to the emergence
of China both as a world power and a force in the Middle East.  He warns
that America will have a second chance after 2008, but there definitely
won't be a third chance.

External links
Zbigniew Brzezinski discusses the book on The Daily Show with Jon Stewart, March 14, 2007
C-SPAN Q&A interview with Brzezinski about Second Chance, April 8, 2007
Review of Second Chance in cosmopolis.ch

2007 books
American political books
Books about foreign relations of the United States
Books about George H. W. Bush
Books about Bill Clinton
Books about George W. Bush